Greenwood Farm is an historic home and farm located in Tredyffrin Township, Chester County, Pennsylvania.

It was listed on the National Register of Historic Places in 1996.

History and architectural features
The property includes the stone farmhouse, stone bank barn (built circa 1793), stone carriage house, tenant house, stone smokehouse, tennis court, and swimming pool.

The house pre-dates 1798, and was originally a three-bay, double-pile stone structure. A two-bay wing was added in the nineteenth century. The house was remodeled in 1915 in the Colonial Revival style.

It was listed on the National Register of Historic Places in 1996.

References

Valley Forge
Houses on the National Register of Historic Places in Pennsylvania
Colonial Revival architecture in Pennsylvania
Houses completed in 1915
Houses in Chester County, Pennsylvania
National Register of Historic Places in Chester County, Pennsylvania